Potlatch was an annual non-profit science fiction convention held in the Pacific Northwest region of North America since 1992. Unlike most SF conventions, Potlatch designates a "Book of Honor" rather than author, editor, fan, and/or artist "Guests of Honor;" the appellation "Book of Honor" does not preclude works from other media receiving the honor, such as films.

Books of Honor
 Potlatch 1, 1992 : None
 Potlatch 2, 1993 : Frankensteinby Mary Shelley
 Potlatch 3, 1994 : None
 Potlatch 4, 1995 : The Only Neat Thing to Do by James Tiptree, Jr.
 Potlatch 5, 1996 : The Lathe of Heaven (video, based on the novel by Ursula K. Le Guin)
 Potlatch 6, 1997 : None
 Potlatch 7, 1998 : The War of the Worlds by H. G. Wells
 Potlatch 8, 1999 : None
 Potlatch 9, 2000 : None (also described as "Corflatch" due to being held in conjunction with Corflu 17). 
 Potlatch 10, 2001 : Thunder and Roses by Theodore Sturgeon
 Potlatch 11, 2002 : None
 Potlatch 12, 2003 : The Rediscovery of Man by Cordwainer Smith
 Potlatch 13, 2004 : The Shockwave Rider by John Brunner
 Potlatch 14, 2005 : A Scanner Darkly by Philip K. Dick
 Potlatch 15, 2006 : The Avram Davidson Treasury edited by Robert Silverberg and Grania Davis
 Potlatch 16, 2007 : Dimensions of Sheckley: the Selected Novels by Robert Sheckley
 Potlatch 17, 2008 : Parable of the Sower by Octavia E. Butler
 Potlatch 18, 2009 : Always Coming Home by Ursula K. Le Guin and Growing Up Weightless by John M. Ford
 Potlatch 19, 2010 : Lord of Light by Roger Zelazny
 Potlatch 20, 2011 : Earth Abides by George R. Stewart
 Potlatch 21, 2012 : A Canticle for Leibowitz by Walter M. Miller, Jr.
 Potlatch 22, 2013 : Among Others by Jo Walton

References

External links 
Potlatch home page

Recurring events established in 1992
Annual events in the United States
Defunct science fiction conventions in the United States